The 2022 CAF Champions League Final was the final match of the 2021–22 CAF Champions League, the 58th season of Africa's premier club football tournament organised by CAF, and the 26th edition under the current CAF Champions League title. It was played at the Stade Mohammed V in Casablanca, in Morocco on 30 May 2022.

Wydad AC won the match 2–0 to clinch their third Champions League title.

As winners, they earned the right to play against the winners of the 2021–22 CAF Confederation Cup, RS Berkane, in the 2022 CAF Super Cup.

When Morocco won the right to host 2022 FIFA Club World Cup , Al Ahly took Morocco's slot as Morocco's Wydad AC took CAF slot which was decided by this match.

Teams
In the following table, finals until 1996 were in the African Cup of Champions Club era, since 1997 were in the CAF Champions League era.

Venue
For the third consecutive year, the final was played as a single match at a pre-selected venue by CAF instead of a two-legged fixtures format, which was being used in the CAF competitions since 1966.

On 12 April 2022, Royal Moroccan Football Federation submitted its bid to host the match, while the Senegalese Football Federation bidding date is unknown.

On 9 May 2022, Stade Mohammed V in Casablanca, Morocco was chosen by a CAF Executive Committee to host the final after the Senegalese Football Federation subsequently withdrew their bid.

Road to the final

Note: In all results below, the score of the finalist is given first (H: home; A: away).

Format
The final was played as a single match at a pre-selected venue, with the winner of semi-final 1 according to the knockout stage draw designated as the "home" team for administrative purposes. If scores were level after full time, extra time was played and if it was still level, the winners were decided by a penalty shoot-out (Regulations Article III. 28).

Match

Details

Statistics

See also
2022 CAF Confederation Cup Final
2022 CAF Super Cup
Al Ahly SC in international football
Wydad AC in international football

Notes

References

External links
CAFonline.com

2022
Final
International club association football competitions hosted by Morocco
May 2022 sports events in Africa
Al Ahly SC matches
Wydad AC matches